Elsecar Heritage Centre is a visitor attraction centre in Elsecar, Barnsley, England. Operated by Barnsley Museums, it has independent shops, studios, galleries, cafes and a large antiques centre in former Victorian engineering workshops.

A visitor centre and regular tours share the unique history of the village, an industrial estate village of ironworks and collieries, built for the Earls Fitzwilliam of Wentworth Woodhouse.

Elsecar is now recognised to be of international significance, one of the UK's first model villages and a precursor to places like Saltaire.

Close to the heritage centre, at the Elsecar New Colliery, is a Newcomen steam engine, the only such engine still in its original location and now understood to be the world's oldest steam engine still in situ.

Heritage Centre

The New Yard 
The New Yard workshops were built for Earl Fitzwilliam in 1850, as a base for carpenters, engineers, joiners, blacksmiths and others who supported the village's collieries, ironworks and the Wentworth Woodhouse estate. The workshops later became part of the National Coal Board until closure in the 1980s.

The New Yard is now home to almost 40 independent shops, galleries, cafes, a children's play space and large antiques centre.

A visitor centre has exhibits, films, interactive displays for children and an in-depth digital reconstruction of what the village and its valley looked like in the year 1880.

The Elsecar Ironworks 
The rolling mill of the former Elsecar Ironworks now hosts large events, including antiques fairs, maker markets, concerts and weddings.

The Earl's Great Engine

The Elsecar New Colliery is the site of the only Newcomen beam engine in the world still in its original location, built in 1795 at the instruction of William Wentworth, the 4th Earl Fitzwilliam.

It is now recognised to be the world's oldest steam engine still in place anywhere.

It pumped water out of Elsecar New Colliery and ran from 1795 until 1923 when it was replaced by electric pumps. In 1973 the engine was classified as a scheduled ancient monument.

The engine was restored to working order (worked by hydraulics) over the period 2012–14.

Visitors can visit it 7 days a week (except in extreme weather) and on special open days and weekly tours between Easter and October each year.

See also
Listed buildings in Hoyland Milton

References

External links

 The Newcomen engine
 Elsecar Heritage Centre - Barnsley Council official site
 

Tourist attractions in Barnsley
Industry museums in England
Buildings and structures in the Metropolitan Borough of Barnsley
Museums in South Yorkshire
Preserved beam engines
History of the steam engine
Industrial Revolution
Hoyland